Nathan Gershman, born Nathan Gerschman (November 29, 1917, Philadelphia – September 13, 2008, North Hollywood) was an American cellist and session musician who played in popular music, jazz, and classical idioms.

Gershman was the brother of violinist Paul Gershman, and received classical training at the Curtis Institute of Music, graduating in 1940. From 1940 to 1947 he played with the Cleveland Orchestra, then moved to New York City to work as a studio musician, working in the same capacity in Los Angeles after 1954. In 1957 he replaced Fred Katz as cellist in Chico Hamilton's band, playing with Hamilton until 1961. As a jazz musician, he also worked in the 1970s with Nat Adderley, Gábor Szabó, and Ronnie Laws. He was frequently active as a session player and studio musician for television, theater, and recordings in and around Los Angeles from the 1960s into the 1990s, and played on albums by David Axelrod, The Beach Boys, Geronimo Black, David Bromberg, Neil Diamond, Lee Hazlewood, Wayne Henderson, Van Dyke Parks, Esther Phillips, and Pleasure.

References
"Nat Gershman". The New Grove Dictionary of Jazz. 2nd edition, ed. Barry Kernfeld.

1917 births
2008 deaths
American jazz cellists
American male jazz musicians
American session musicians
Musicians from Philadelphia
Curtis Institute of Music alumni
Jazz musicians from Pennsylvania
20th-century American male musicians
20th-century cellists